The Western Canada Lottery Corporation (WCLC) is a Canadian non-profit organization founded in 1974 that operates lottery and gaming-related activities for its members, the governments of Alberta, Saskatchewan and Manitoba. Yukon, the Northwest Territories and Nunavut participate as associate members. WCLC works in conjunction with the Alberta Gaming, Liquor and Cannabis Commission (AGLC), Saskatchewan Lotteries (which is operated by Sask Sport under purview of the Saskatchewan Liquor and Gaming Authority), Manitoba Liquor & Lotteries Corporation, Lotteries Yukon and Sport North Lottery Authority. In conjunction with the Interprovincial Lottery Corporation, WCLC offers Canada's highest payout lotteries, Lotto 6/49, Lotto Max (which replaced Lotto Super 7 in September 2009), and Daily Grand.

In the late 1970s through the mid-1980s, WCLC produced a weekly televised drawing for the Western Express lottery, Winsday, which aired regionally on CTV via its western Canadian affiliates. Hosted by sportscaster Don Wittman, Winsday alternated between showing the draws (several were held each week) and featuring interviews and regional profiles.

Games offered 
Lotto 6/49
 Western 6/49
Lotto Max
 Western Max 
Daily Grand
 Pick 2
 Pick 3
 Pick 4
Sport Select (Proline, Over Under, Point Spread, Props, Pools)
 Keno
 Poker Lotto

Note: The above list shows only draw-based games. WCLC also administers numerous scratch card-based lottery games.

Former games
Lotto Super 7
PayDay
The Provincial
Western Express (now the scratch card-based The Western)

References

External links
 

Lotteries in Canada
Computer-drawn lottery games
Non-profit corporations
Non-profit organizations based in Manitoba
Organizations established in 1974
Organizations based in Winnipeg